Taygete attributella is a moth of the family Autostichidae. It is found in North America, including Illinois, Massachusetts, Minnesota, New Jersey, New York, Pennsylvania and Virginia.

References

Moths described in 1864
Taygete (moth)